Cyrtodactylus evanquahi or Evan Quah's banded bent-toed gecko is a species of lizard in the family Gekkonidae. The species is endemic to Malaysia.

Etymology
The specific name, evanquahi, is in honor of Malaysian herpetologist Evan Seng Huat Quah.

Geographic range
C. evanquahi is found in northwestern Peninsular Malaysia, in Kedah state.

Description

Reproduction
The mode of reproduction of C. evanquahi is unknown.

References

Further reading
Wood PL, Grismer LL, Muin MA, Anuar S, Oaks JR (2020). "A new potentially endangered limestone-associated Bent-toed Gecko of the Cyrtodactylus pulchellus (Squamata: Gekkonidae) complex from northern Peninsular Malaysia". Zootaxa 4751 (3): 437–460. (Cyrtodactylus evanquahi, new species).

Reptiles of Malaysia
Cyrtodactylus
Reptiles described in 2020
Taxa named by Perry L. Wood
Taxa named by Larry Lee Grismer
Taxa named by Mohd Abdul Muin
Taxa named by Shahrul Anuar
Taxa named by Jamie R. Oaks
Taxa named by Jack W. Sites Jr.